The Iowa Library Association (1890) is a professional organization for Iowa's librarians and library workers.  It is headquartered in Des Moines, Iowa. It was founded on September 2, 1890, in Des Moines, Iowa at the State Library in the Iowa State Capitol, by Ada E. North, Librarian at the State University of Iowa in Iowa City; State Librarian Mary Miller, T.S. Parvin of the Iowa Masonic Library, Clara M. Smith of the Burlington Public Library, and Clara C. Dwight of the Dubuque Y.M. Library.

Mary H. Miller was elected as the first President by the five organizers and twelve other librarians. The fledgling organization borrowed its bylaws from the New York Library Association, which was founded earlier that same year. The original bylaws established dues of one dollar per year and required that the association hold an annual meeting during the week of the Iowa State Fair.

The Association now has over 1600 members from over 500 public, academic, and special libraries all over the state.

References

External links
 Iowa Library Association website

iowa
Organizations based in Iowa